Jewett is a village in Harrison County, Ohio, United States. The population was 692 at the 2010 census.

History
Jewett was originally called Fairview, and under the latter name was platted in 1851. The present name is for T. M. Jewett, a railroad official.

Jewett was the original home of the Jewett Car Company, a street car manufacturer, from 1894 until 1904. The street cars produced by this factory were shipped throughout the United States. The Jewett Car Company relocated to Newark, Ohio in 1904, and ceased operations in 1919.

Geography

Jewett is located at  (40.368020, -81.003026).

It is paved and suitable for bicycling, non-electric scootering, roller blading, wheel chairing, walking, running, and jogging.

Demographics

2010 census
As of the census of 2010, there were 692 people, 273 households, and 188 families living in the village. The racial makeup of the village was 96.7% White, 0.3% African American, 0.1% from other races, and 2.9% from two or more races. Hispanic or Latino of any race were 0.1% of the population.

There were 273 households, 33.7% of which had children under the age of 18 living with them, 50.2% were married couples living together, 11.7% had a female householder with no husband present, 7.0% had a male householder with no wife present, and 31.1% were non-families. 26.0% of all households were made up of individuals, and 11.7% had someone living alone who was 65 years of age or older. The average household size was 2.53 and the average family size was 2.96.

The median age in the village was 36.9 years. 25.6% of residents were under the age of 18; 9.1% were between the ages of 18 and 24; 26.4% were from 25 to 44; 23.9% were from 45 to 64; and 14.9% were 65 years of age or older. The gender makeup of the village was 50.6% male and 49.4% female.

2000 census
As of the census of 2000, there were 784 people, 300 households, and 219 families living in the village. The racial makeup of the village was 98.60% White, 0.26% Native American, and 1.15% from two or more races. Hispanic or Latino of any race were 0.13% of the population.

There were 300 households, 34.7% of which had children under the age of 18 living with them, 55.7% were married couples living together, 13.0% had a female householder with no husband present, and 26.7% were non-families. 24.3% of all households were made up of individuals, and 12.7% had someone living alone who was 65 years of age or older. The average household size was 2.61 and the average family size was 3.05.

The population in the village was spread out, with 28.6% under the age of 18, 7.3% from 18 to 24, 26.7% from 25 to 44, 21.7% from 45 to 64, and 15.8% who were 65 years of age or older. The median age was 36 years. For every 100 females there were 92.6 males. For every 100 females aged 18 and over, there were 87.3 males.

The median income for a household in the village was $27,125, and the median income for a family was $29,297. Males had a median income of $30,313 versus $16,333 for females. The per capita income for the village was $12,158. About 15.8% of families and 21.7% of the population were below the poverty line, including 37.6% of those under age 18 and 4.1% of 65+ residents.

References

Further reading
 Brough, Lawrence A., and James H. Graebner.  From Small Town to Downtown: A History of the Jewett Car Company, 1893–1919.

Villages in Harrison County, Ohio
Villages in Ohio